Count Széchenyi András Andor István Mária Béla de Sárvár-Felsővidék (August 1, 1865 – March 2, 1907) was a Hungarian nobleman and traveler. He was a grandson of Count István Széchenyi.

He was the first-born child of Ottoman Pasha Ödön Széchenyi and Irma Almay. He traveled around the world: islands of the Pacific Ocean, Somaliland, to China across Russia, Persia and India. His travelogue was published by Geographical Society in Vienna. He made attempts to travel to Paris by dirigible airship.

Family
He married Elena Korostowzoff in summer 1884 but they divorced in 1899. They had a son: Lipót András István Miklós Sándor Katalin (1886-1920).

References
 Széchenyi Andor

1865 births
1907 deaths
Hungarian nobility
Hungarian explorers
Andor
People from Pest, Hungary